Zeke Elakhe Lungelo Mngqolo (born 9 September 1982), popularly known as Thami Mngqolo, is a South African actor and director. He is best known for his roles in the popular series Generations, State Enemy No.1 and Greed and Desire.

Personal life
Mngqolo was born on 9 September 1982 in Johannesburg, South Africa as the second child of the family. He has one elder sister Uvolethwu Mngqolo, who died in 2016.

He had a long-term relationship with fellow actress Jo-Anne Reyneke. They began dating in 2008 and had two children, Uvolwethu (born in 2013) and Lungelo (born in 2015). In 2018, the couple called it quits after Reyneke allegedly found a compromising video on his cell phone.

Career
In 2003, he appeared in the television serial Generations and played the role of Senzo Dlomo, a gay man. In 2016, he stopped acting in the series when its entire main cast was fired over their demands for a higher salary. He has also featured in State Actor No.1. He also played as a receptionist in popular soap opera Muvhango. In November 2020, he joined the cast of the telenovela Isono. In the series, he plays the role Maradona.

Filmography

References

External links
 

Living people
South African male television actors
South African male film actors
1982 births
People from Johannesburg